Franz Raschid (18 October 1954 – 22 October 2010) was a German professional football player and manager.

Career
Raschid, who played as a left midfielder, spent his entire professional career with Bayer Uerdingen, scoring 51 goals in 364 League appearances. He later became a football manager, taking control of Arminia Bielefeld between 1990 and 1991.

Death
Raschid died on 22 October 2010, aged 56, from pancreatic cancer.

References

1954 births
2010 deaths
German footballers
KFC Uerdingen 05 players
German football managers
Arminia Bielefeld managers
Deaths from pancreatic cancer
Deaths from cancer in Germany
Bundesliga players
2. Bundesliga players
Association football midfielders
People from Neuwied
Footballers from Rhineland-Palatinate